The 1958 Detroit Tigers season was a season in American baseball. The team finished fifth in the American League with a record of 77–77, 15 games behind the New York Yankees.

Offseason 
 November 20, 1957: Bill Tuttle, Jim Small, Duke Maas, John Tsitouris, Frank House, Kent Hadley and a player to be named later were traded by the Tigers to the Kansas City Athletics for Billy Martin, Mickey McDermott, Tom Morgan, Lou Skizas, Tim Thompson, and Gus Zernial. The Tigers completed the deal by sending Jim McManus to the Athletics on April 3.
 December 11, 1957: Dave Philley was purchased from the Tigers by the Philadelphia Phillies.
 February 18, 1958: Jay Porter and Hal Woodeshick were traded by the Tigers to the Cleveland Indians for Hank Aguirre and Jim Hegan.
 March 27, 1958: Pete Wojey and $20,000 were traded by the Tigers to the Cleveland Indians for Vito Valentinetti and Milt Bolling.

Regular season

Season standings

Record vs. opponents

Notable transactions 
 June 15, 1958: Ray Boone and Bob Shaw were traded by the Tigers to the Chicago White Sox for Bill Fischer and Tito Francona.
 June 23, 1958: Vito Valentinetti was traded by the Tigers to the Washington Senators for Al Cicotte.
 June 30, 1958: Mickey Lolich was signed as an amateur free agent by the Tigers.

Roster

Player stats

Batting

Starters by position 
Note: Pos = Position; G = Games played; AB = At bats; H = Hits; Avg. = Batting average; HR = Home runs; RBI = Runs batted in

Other batters 
Note: G = Games played; AB = At bats; H = Hits; Avg. = Batting average; HR = Home runs; RBI = Runs batted in

Pitching

Starting pitchers 
Note: G = Games pitched; IP = Innings pitched; W = Wins; L = Losses; ERA = Earned run average; SO = Strikeouts

Other pitchers 
Note: G = Games pitched; IP = Innings pitched; W = Wins; L = Losses; ERA = Earned run average; SO = Strikeouts

Relief pitchers 
Note: G = Games pitched; W = Wins; L = Losses; SV = Saves; ERA = Earned run average; SO = Strikeouts

Farm system 

LEAGUE CHAMPIONS: Birmingham, Valdosta

Notes

References 

1958 Detroit Tigers season at Baseball Reference

Detroit Tigers seasons
Detroit Tigers season
Detroit Tigers
1958 in Detroit